Thomas Lowrie (14 January 1928 – 24 April 2009) was a Scottish footballer.

Lowrie played for Troon Athletic as a youth, before joining English club Manchester United in 1947. He later played for Aberdeen, Oldham Athletic, Stranraer and Berwick Rangers before retiring in 1956. He went on to coach at East Kilbride Thistle. Lowrie died in 2009, aged 81.

References

External links
MUFCInfo.com profile

1928 births
2009 deaths
Scottish footballers
Troon F.C. players
Stranraer F.C. players
Manchester United F.C. players
Aberdeen F.C. players
Berwick Rangers F.C. players
Oldham Athletic A.F.C. players
Scottish Football League players
English Football League players
Association football wing halves